North Furlong Lake is a glacial tarn in the Ruby Mountains, in Elko County in the northeastern part of the state of Nevada. This is a common camp for users of the Ruby Crest National Recreation Trail, which passes nearby.

North Furlong Lake is the primary source of North Furlong Creek, which after exiting the mountains merges with other streams to form the South Fork of the Humboldt River.

References 

Lakes of Elko County, Nevada
Ruby Mountains
Lakes of Nevada
Lakes of the Great Basin